GRB 980425 was a gamma-ray burst (GRB) that was detected on 25 April 1998 at 21:49 UTC.

Observations 
GRB 980425 was first detected by the Gamma-Ray Burst Monitor onboard BeppoSAX on 25 April 1998 at 21:49 UTC. The burst lasted approximately 30 seconds and had a single peak in its light curve. The Narrow Field Instruments (NFIs) onboard BeppoSAX began making observations of the region approximately 10 hours after the burst was detected. The NFIs detected two previously unknown x-ray sources—one at α = , δ = , and the other at α = , δ = . In the days that followed the burst, a variable object was detected in the original BeppoSAX error box that was not coincident with either of the two X-ray sources. The object's light curve implied that it might be a supernova.

Supernova relation 
A search for the burst's radio afterglow resulted in one object that was coincident with the previously discovered supernova candidate, giving early credence to the idea that SN 1998bw and GRB 980425 were related. This was the first evidence of a physical relationship between gamma-ray bursts and supernovae. Evidence for this relationship and the details thereof continues to develop in the years since this breakthrough. Analyses of previously discovered bursts, such as GRB 970228 and GRB 980326, showed that they may have also been affected by supernovae.

Notes 

980425
19980425
April 1998 events
Telescopium (constellation)